The Madras Veterinary College, the college affiliated with Tamil Nadu Veterinary and Animal Sciences University, is a veterinary college in Vepery, a suburb of Chennai, Tamil Nadu, India. The college was established on 1 October 1903 in a small building known as Doblin Hall.

The college became affiliated with the University of Madras in 1936 and became the first college to offer the bachelor's degree in Veterinary Medicine in India. In 1989, the first veterinary university in India, Tamil Nadu Veterinary and Animal Sciences University (TANUVAS), was formed, and the college became affiliated with it.  The current Dean is R. Karunakaran, who has held the post since September 2021.

Courses offered 
B.VSc & AH
M.VSc
Ph.D
PG Diploma in Companion Animal Practice

MVC Teaching Hospital 
The MVC Teaching Hospital is the largest, in the country with extensive facilities. The animal hospital is equipped with radiology, ultrasonography, doppler ultrasound, CT Scan, echocardiogram, video endoscopy, laparoscopy and small animal surgery. Additionally, the hospital has a haemodialysis facility for small animals and a special rabies ward.

The veterinary hospital receives referral cases from all over India, including horses, domestic ruminants, and small animals. there was mobile clinic facilities also available

See also 
 Karnataka Veterinary, Animal and Fisheries Sciences University
 Kerala Veterinary College, Mannuthy
 Rajiv Gandhi College of Veterinary and Animal Sciences
 West Bengal University of Animal and Fishery Sciences

References

External links
 Madras Veterinary College
 Tamilnadu Veterinary and Animal Sciences University

Veterinary schools in India
Universities and colleges in Chennai
Academic institutions formerly affiliated with the University of Madras